T.A.N.K. is a vertically scrolling multidirectional shooter developed and released in arcades by SNK 1985. It was published in North America as TNK III by Kitcorp. Versions of T.A.N.K. for home computers were released by Ocean Software for the ZX Spectrum, Commodore 64, and Amstrad CPC in 1987. A sequel was also released for the Nintendo Entertainment System titled Iron Tank.

T.A.N.K. features the first appearance of Ralf Jones (AKA: Paul), predating his appearance in Ikari Warriors (1986). T.A.N.K. also introduced rotary joystick controls. The game's lead designer was Koji Obada, who went on to design and direct SNK's arcade hit Ikari Warriors, which popularized the rotary joystick controls introduced by T.A.N.K.

Gameplay
The player commands a tank that can fire machine guns and cannons to destroy any opposition en route to the player's destination, passing enemy infantry, missiles, tanks, and gun emplacements on the way. Scattered around the game are power-ups that can be retrieved.

The game is controlled using a rotary joystick. It is a type of joystick-knob hybrid, with an eight-directional joystick controlling the direction of the tank's movement, while it can be turned with 360-degree rotation to point the direction of the gun turret.

Development
The game was developed by SNK, where it was designed and directed by Koji Obada, who previously designed Munch Mobile (Joyful Road in Japan). At the time, SNK was on the verge of bankruptcy. According to Obata, their line of thinking was, "if we’re going to go bankrupt, let’s do something crazy and go out with a bang!" A programmer from SNK discovered Taito's arcade shooter Front Line (1982), and thought that SNK could go further with the gameplay format. The team improved on Front Line with the addition of a rotary joystick, or what they called a "loop lever" joystick. The team came up with the rotary joystick when, according to Obada, "our hands hurt, so someone got the idea to put a film capsule container over the joystick, which would spin around in place there".

Reception
In Japan, Game Machine listed T.A.N.K. on their August 15, 1985 issue as being the sixth most-successful table arcade unit of the month.

Computer and Video Games gave the arcade version of T.A.N.K. a positive review in January 1986, with praise for the "instantly playable" and "action-packed" gameplay as well as the rotary joystick controls, but they felt the graphics were dated. Mike Roberts and Eric Doyle of Computer Gamer magazine also gave the arcade game a positive review in early 1986, praising the "novel joystick" controls and comparing the gameplay favorably with Capcom's run-and-gun shooter Commando (1985), stating it is "approaching that sort of quality".

The Commodore 64 version of the game was reviewed in 1988 in Dragon #135 by Hartley, Patricia, and Kirk Lesser in "The Role of Computers" column. The reviewers gave the game 3 out of 5 stars.

Legacy
The same year, Capcom's run-and-gun shooter Commando was a major hit in arcades. Koji Obada went on to combine the run-and-gun shooter gameplay of Commando with the rotary joystick controls and tank vehicles of T.A.N.K. to develop Ikari Warriors (1986), which became a major hit in arcades.

References

External links

TNK III at MobyGames
TNK III at GameFAQs
TNK III  at Allgame

1985 video games
Amstrad CPC games
Arcade video games
Commodore 64 games
Hamster Corporation games
Kitkorp games
Multidirectional shooters
Nintendo Switch games
Ocean Software games
PlayStation 4 games
PlayStation Network games
SNK games
SNK Playmore games
Tank simulation video games
Video games developed in Japan
ZX Spectrum games